MarinaScape is a complex of two residential towers in Dubai Marina in Dubai, United Arab Emirates.  Oceanic Tower consists of 34 storeys and has a total structural height of 132 m (430 ft).  The shorter tower, Avant Tower, consists of 26 storeys at a height of 104 m (340 ft).  The towers was handed over to owners in December 2008.

See also
 List of buildings in Dubai

External links
MarinaScape on Emporis.com
Oceanic Tower on SkyscraperPage.com
Avant Tower on SkyscraperPage.com
Marinascape Avant and Marinascape Oceanic Owners and Tenants Website

Residential skyscrapers in Dubai
Residential buildings completed in 2008
Twin towers